Yaqubiyeh (also Romanized as Ya‘qūbīyeh; also known as Ya‘qūbīyeh-ye Chāh Kavīr) is a village in Dastgerdan Rural District, Dastgerdan District, Tabas County, South Khorasan Province, Iran. At the 2006 census, its population was 39, in 12 families.

References 

Populated places in Tabas County